The Ghan is an experiential tourism oriented passenger train service that operates between the northern and southern coasts of Australia, through the cities of Adelaide, Alice Springs and Darwin on the Adelaide–Darwin rail corridor. Operated by Journey Beyond Rail Expeditions, its scheduled travelling time, including extended stops for passengers
The Ghan has been described as one of the world's great passenger trains.

Etymology

The service's name is an abbreviated version of its previous nickname, The Afghan Express. The nickname is reputed to have been bestowed in 1923 by one of its crews. Some suggest the train's name honours Afghan camel drivers who arrived in Australia in the late 19th century to help the British colonisers find a way to reach the country's interior.

A contrary view is that the name was a veiled insult. In 1891, the railway from Quorn reached remote Oodnadatta where an itinerant population of around 150 cameleers were based, generically called "Afghans". "The Ghan Express" name originated with train crews in the 1890s as a taunt to officialdom because, when an expensive sleeping car was put on from Quorn to Oodnadatta, "on the first return journey the only passenger was an Afghan", mocking its commercial viability.

By as early as 1924, because of the notorious unreliability of this fortnightly steam train, European pastoralists commonly called it "in ribald fashion The Afghan Express". By 1951, when steam engines were replaced by diesel-electric locomotives, this disparaging derivation, like the cameleers, had faded away. Modern marketing has completed the name turnabout.

Operations
The Ghan was privatised in 1997 and has since then been operated by Journey Beyond Rail Expeditions (formerly known as Great Southern Rail), initially as part of the Serco Group. Great Southern Rail was sold to Allegro Funds, a Sydney investment fund, in March 2015.

The train usually runs weekly. During December 2012 and January 2013 it ran only once every two weeks. Until 2016, a second service operated between June and September. The train stops at Adelaide, Alice Springs, Katherine and Darwin; the stops at Alice Springs and Katherine allow time for passengers to take optional tours.

Each train has 16 to 38 stainless steel carriages, built by Comeng, Granville, in the late 1960s and early 1970s for the Indian Pacific, plus a motorail wagon. Two Pacific National NR class locomotives haul the train, previously AN class or a DL class locomotives assisted.

History
Starting in August 1929, The Ghan ran on the Central Australian Railway, originally built as a  narrow-gauge railway to Alice Springs under Chief Engineer, Commonwealth Railways, N. G. Bell. In 1957, the  standard gauge Stirling North to Marree line opened, and the Ghan was curtailed to operate only north of Marree.

In October 1980, the remainder of the line was replaced by a standard-gauge line built to the west of the original line. An extension north from Alice Springs to Darwin opened in January 2004.

Original Ghan
Construction of what was then known as the Port Augusta to Government Gums Railway began in 1878 when Premier of South Australia William Jervois broke ground at Port Augusta. The  line reached Hawker in June 1880, Beltana in July 1881, Marree in January 1884 and Oodnadatta in January 1891. Work on the extension to Alice Springs began in 1926, and was completed in 1929. Until then, the final leg of the train journey was still made by camel.

Although there were plans from the beginning to extend the line to Darwin, by the time the extension to Alice Springs had been completed, The Ghan was losing money and the plans for further extension to Darwin were suspended indefinitely. The original Ghan line followed the same track as the overland telegraph, which is believed to be the route taken by John McDouall Stuart during his 1862 crossing of Australia.

The Ghan service was notorious for delays caused by washouts of the track. A flatcar immediately behind the locomotive carried spare sleepers and railway tools, so passengers and crew could repair the line. The very uncertain service via this route was tolerated because steam locomotives needed large quantities of water, and Stuart's route to Alice Springs was the only one that had sufficient available water.

Initially operated fortnightly, in the 1930s, it was increased to weekly. From 1956 until 1975, it operated twice weekly, before reverting to a weekly service.

During World War II, the service had to be greatly expanded, putting great pressure on the limited water supplies. As a result, de-mineralisation towers, some of which survive to this day, were built along the track so that bore water could be used. When a new line to Alice Springs was built in the 1970s, the use of diesel locomotives meant that there was far less need for water, thus allowing the line to take the much drier route from Tarcoola to Alice Springs.

The last narrow gauge service departed Alice Springs on 26 November 1980.

New line
In October 1980, a new standard gauge line from Tarcoola on the Trans-Australian Railway to Alice Springs opened, and the train took the form it has today. It was also hoped that the construction of the new line would improve the train's timekeeping.

The first Ghan on the new line departed Adelaide on 11 December 1980. It initially operated as a broad gauge service to Port Pirie. Following the conversion of the Adelaide to Crystal Brook to standard gauge in 1982, it operated as a standard gauge train throughout. Operating weekly, a second service was operated between May and October.

In November 1998, one service per week was extended from Adelaide to Melbourne while from April 1999, the other was diverted to operate to Sydney via Broken Hill.<ref>GSR's Ghan Commences Melbourne Runs Catch Point issue 129 January 1999 page 5</ref>First Run of Ghan to Sydney Catch Point issue 131 May 1999 page 5 The extensions were withdrawn in November 2002 and March 2003 respectively.Last Ghan into Sydney pulls up short Railway Digest May 2003 page 8

Connection to Darwin
Construction of Alice Springs–Darwin line was believed to be the second-largest civil engineering project in Australia, and the largest since the creation of the Snowy Mountains Scheme.
Line construction began in July 2001, with the first passenger train reaching Darwin on 3 February 2004, after 126 years of planning and waiting and at a cost of $1.3 billion.The Ghan's arrival in Darwin signified a new era of tourism in the Northern Territory, making travel to the region easier and more convenient. The rail link will allow for more freight to travel through the region, leading to a hope that Darwin will serve as another trade link with Asia.

In preparation for the connection to Darwin, one of the locomotives was named after wildlife expert Steve Irwin, an international symbol of outback Australia, to promote the new service and tourism to the region.

 Suspension during pandemic 
The Ghan was suspended for five months from March to August 2020 due to COVID-19 restrictions and border closures – the longest suspension in the train's existence. The first post-COVID train departed Adelaide for Darwin on 31 August 2020.

Media depictions
The original Ghan was featured in an episode of BBC Television's series Great Railway Journeys of the World in 1980, presented by Michael Frayn.

The modern Ghan featured in an episode of Channel 5 series Chris Tarrant: Extreme Railways, and the Mighty Trains series.

In 2018, it was also the subject of SBS slow television documentary The Ghan: Australia's Greatest Train Journey. The entire journey from Adelaide to Darwin which was filmed in 2017, was condensed into a three-hour highlights show with no voiceover or narration, much of it featuring footage directly from the front of the locomotive and various helicopter views. An extended 17-hour version of the show aired on SBS's secondary channel, SBS Viceland.

In October 2019, the train featured in BBC Two's episode one of Michael Portillo's Great Australian Railway Journeys.

Noteworthy incidents
 On 24 October 2002, The Ghan collided with a school bus in Salisbury, South Australia. Four people on the bus were killed, but there were no significant injuries to the Ghan passengers.
Seven of the eleven carriages came off the tracks. One woman was critically injured; other passengers received only minor injuries. The truck driver involved was arrested, according to the NT police, charged and found guilty of a number of charges related to the accident.
 On 4 March 2007, rain washed out a portion of the track between Darwin and Adelaide River. During the period of repairs, trains terminated at Katherine.
Three passengers suffered from shock and minor injuries. The truck driver was temporarily trapped in his vehicle.
On 6 June 2009, a nineteen-year-old American tourist clung to the outside of The Ghan'' for two hours and  when he was locked out of the train following a stop in Port Augusta. A technician heard his screams and stopped the train.

Gallery

References

Further reading

External links

The Ghan ephemera digitised and held by the National Library of Australia
The Ghan Australia's Greatest Train Journey 3-hour "Slow TV" documentary by SBS TV, first broadcast 7 January 2018 (video not accessible outside Australia)
The Ghan Australia's Greatest Train Journey aired on BBC Four on 28 October 2018

Adelaide-Darwin railway corridor
Interstate rail in Australia
Luxury trains
Named passenger trains of Australia
Railway services introduced in 1929
Passenger rail transport in the Northern Territory
Rail transport in South Australia
1929 establishments in Australia
Motorail